Macanese Portuguese is a Portuguese dialect spoken in Macau, where Portuguese is co-official with Cantonese. Macanese Portuguese is spoken, to some degree either natively or as a second language, by roughly 1% of the population of Macau. It should not be confused with Macanese language (or ), a distinct Portuguese creole that developed in Macau during the Portuguese rule.

History

Macau had its first contact with the Portuguese language in 1557 when the territory was established as a trade center of Portugal to other parts of Asia.  The language largely entered Macau in the 19th century when China ceded Macau to Portugal and Macau was declared a formal Portuguese province.  At that time, it was made an official language along with Cantonese. Despite being a Portuguese colony for over four centuries, the Portuguese language was never widely spoken in Macau and remained limited to administration and higher education and was spoken primarily by the Portuguese colonists, Macanese people of mixed ancestry (many of whom instead once spoke Macanese Patois), and elites and middle-class people of pure Chinese blood. A Portuguese pidgin was used more widely. Currently, there is only one school in Macau where Portuguese is the medium of instruction, the Macau Portuguese School, and Portuguese is also mainly taught in government schools.

Macau was transferred sovereignty from Portugal to People's Republic of China in 1999, but Portuguese remained an official language. Although Portuguese use was in decline in Asia in the early 21st century after Macau was ceded to China in 1999, there has been an increase in the teaching of Portuguese, mostly due to East Timor's (closest Portuguese-speaking country to Macau) boost in the number of speakers in the last five years, but also the Chinese authorities' protection of Portuguese as official language in Macau, owing to the growing trade links between China and lusophone nations such as Portugal, Brazil, Angola, Mozambique, and East Timor, with 5,000 students learning the language. Because most Macau people speak Cantonese, Portuguese, and Mandarin, they are able to code-switch between these languages.

Features

Phonology
The Macanese dialect was traditionally an Old Portuguese variety. However, nowadays, it closely follows the standard European dialect in pronunciation and vocabulary. The only Portuguese-medium school teaches the standard European dialect, as with most of the CPLP like in East Timor. There are still some phonological differences affected by Cantonese phonology made by those who speak Portuguese as a second language, such as a non-rhotic accent: final  in infinitive verbs is dropped (cf. These phonological differences do not apply to Chinese who have higher education in Portuguese.

Lexicon
Vocabulary is the same as in Portugal, but there are some differences due to Cantonese influence. Macau Portuguese also borrowed words from Malay and from other Indo-European languages like Sinhalese, Konkani, and Marathi languages from the beginning as the Portuguese settlers often married women from Portuguese Malacca, Portuguese India and Portuguese Ceylon rather than from neighbouring China. In the 17th century it was further influenced by the influx of immigrants from other Portuguese colonies in Asia, especially from Portuguese Malacca, Indonesia, and Portuguese Ceylon, that had been displaced by the Dutch expansion in the East Indies, and Japanese Christian refugees. It reached to countries and regions where Portuguese is spoken, especially Portugal where it was brought by Portuguese returnees and some Chinese and Macanese (who are loyal to them) who brought Chinese and Macanese culture. Vocabulary even went to Brazil through leaving Portuguese settlers with some Macanese and Chinese settlers.

See also
East Timorese Portuguese
Goan Portuguese

References

External links
 O Português na Asia

Languages of Macau
Portuguese dialects
Portuguese language in Asia